A stakeout is the hidden surveillance of a location or person for the purpose of gathering evidence

Stakeout or Stake Out may also refer to:

Books
Stakeout, crime novel by Parnell Hall (writer) 2013

Film and TV
Stakeout (1958 film), a Japanese drama film by Yoshitarō Nomura
Stakeout (1987 film), a detective/comedy film starring Richard Dreyfuss and Emilio Estevez
Stakeout (2013 film) or Cold Eyes, a South Korean crime film
Stake Out (game show), a 2001 British programme
Stakeout (Transformers), a fictional character from the Transformer universe

Episodes
"Stakeout" (Amphibia)
"Stakeout" (Brooklyn Nine-Nine)
"Stake Out" (The Professionals)
"The Stakeout" (The Legend of Korra)
"The Stakeout" (Parks and Recreation)
"The Stake Out" (Seinfeld)

Guns
The Ithaca 37 Stakeout Shotgun, A shortened, pistol grip version of the normal Ithaca Model 37 Shotgun